List of Eastern Orthodox Archbishops of Finland, primates of the Finnish Orthodox Church:
 Antonij [Anthony] (Vadkovsky) Archbishop (1892-1898)
 Nikolaj [Nicholas] (Nalimov) Archbishop (1899-1905)
 Sergij [Sergius] (Stragorodsky) Archbishop (1905-1917)
 Seraphim (Lukjanov) Archbishop (1921-1923)
 Herman (Aav) Archbishop (1925-1 Jul 1960)
 Paavali [Paul] (Olmari) (1914-1987) Archbishop (29 Aug 1960-1987)
 Johannes [John] (Rinne) Archbishop (15 Oct 1987-1 Oct 2001)
 Leo (Makkonen) (1948-) Archbishop (25 Oct 2001-present)

Sources 
 Source: http://rulers.org/ (It reports: "© 1995-2005 B. Schemmel. Data from this site may be queried and copied on a not-for-profit basis only if the source is accurately credited. All rights are reserved for profit-seeking purposes.")

 
Finland